Phyllostachys viridiglaucescens  is a species of bamboo found in Fujian, Jiangsu, Jiangxi, Zhejiang provinces of China.

References

External links
 
 

viridiglaucescens
Flora of China
Taxa named by Élie-Abel Carrière